"High End" is a song by American singer Chris Brown featuring American rappers Future and Young Thug. It was released on October 13, 2017 by RCA Records, as a promotional single from Chris Brown's eight studio album Heartbreak on a Full Moon.

Background 
Chris Brown announced a collaboration with Future and Young Thug for a new song. Chris Brown released the song on October 11, 2017. The next day he already released the music video. In "High End", which is a hip hop song, the lyrics talk about the luxury life of the artists. In the song each artist does their verse, and no one claim the hook together.

Brown said that the song was written for the collaborative mixtape by Future and Young Thug, Super Slimey, but Brown asked them for permission to put it on his own album Heartbreak on a Full Moon, because it fit the album's concept.

Music video
The music video was released a day before the original release of the single. The video was directed by Chris Brown and Spiff TV, features cameos from American artists Teyana Taylor, Fabolous and Trey Songz. It shows Future arriving in a nightclub where he begins to dance alongside humans and monsters. Chris appears as a vampire with red eyes who begins to dance. Young Thug appears as a creature with white eyes, in a room surrounded by girls, and later he joins the party.

Credits and personnel
Credits adapted from Tidal.

Chris Brown – vocals, lyrics, composer
Future - vocals, lyrics, composer
Young Thug - vocals, lyrics, composer
Tony Son – lyrics, composer
Richie Souf - producer
Ivan Jimenez - assistant engineer
David Nakaji - assistant engineer
Patrizio Pigliapoco – recording engineer
Tom Coyne – mastering engineer
Jaycen Joshua – mixing engineer

Charts

Certifications

References

2017 songs
Chris Brown songs
Future (rapper) songs
Young Thug songs
Songs written by Chris Brown
Songs written by Future (rapper)
Songs written by Young Thug